Allopeba is a genus of beetles in the family Cerambycidae, containing the following species:

 Allopeba paranaensis (Napp & Reynaud, 1998)
 Allopeba quadripunctatus (Lucas, 1857)
 Allopeba signaticornis (Lucas, 1857)

References

Unxiini